Pruddor is a rural locality (a village) in Beloyevskoye Rural Settlement, Kudymkarsky District, Perm Krai, Russia. The population was 65 as of 2010. There are 4 streets.

Geography 
Pruddor is located 19 km northwest of Kudymkar (the district's administrative centre) by road. Beloyevo is the nearest rural locality.

References 

Rural localities in Kudymkarsky District